The boys' doubles of the tournament 2019 BWF World Junior Championships will be held from 7 to 13 October 2019. The defending champions is Di Zijian/Wang Chang from China.

Seeds 

  Di Zijian / Wang Chang (final)
  Leo Rolly Carnando / Daniel Marthin (champions)
  Dai Enyi / Feng Yanzhe (semifinals)
  William Jones / Brandon Yap (fourth round)
  Rory Easton / Ethan van Leeuwen (quarterfinals)
  Takuma Kawamoto / Tsubasa Kawamura (semifinals)
  Thanawin Madee / Ratchapol Makkasasithorn (third round)
  Ooi Jhy Dar / Yap Roy King (third round)

  Tanadon Punpanich / Sirawit Sothon (fourth round)
  Chen Zhi-ray / Cheng Kai-wen (fourth round)
  Dwiki Rafian Restu / Bernadus Bagas Kusuma Wardana (fourth round)
  Joan Monroy / Carlos Piris (fourth round)
  Howin Wong Jia Hao / Aaron Yong Chuan Shen (fourth round)
  Egor Kholkin / Georgii Lebedev (second round)
  Rasmus Espersen / Marcus Rindshøj (fourth round)
  Wei Chun-wei / Wu Guan-xun (third round)

Draw

Finals

Top half

Section 1

Section 2

Section 3

Section 4

Bottom half

Section 5

Section 6

Section 7

Section 8

References

2019 BWF World Junior Championships